David Ostrowski (born 1981 in Cologne, Germany) is a German painter. He studied at Kunstakademie Düsseldorf with Albert Oehlen. He lives and works in Cologne, Germany.

Exhibitions 

 F, Artothek, Cologne, Germany, 2013
 Just Do It, Fondazione Sandretto Re Rebaudengo, Torino, Italy, 2014 (video)
 How to Do Things Left, Rubell Museum, Miami, Florida, 2015
 I Want to Die Forever, Kunstraum Innsbruck, Austria, 2015
 The F Word, Arken Museum, Ishøj, Denmark, 2015
 To Lose, Düren, Germany, (with Michail Pirgelis), 2016 (German)
 Bei Mir Geht Es In Den Keller Hoch, Barcelona, Spain, 2017

Collections
His work is held in the collections of the Fondazione Sandretto Re Rebaudengo in Turin, Italy; the Colección Jumex of the Fundación Eugenio Lopez in Mexico City; and the Moderna Museet in Stockholm.

Awards
 2012 Studio programme Kölnischer Kunstverein und Imhoff-Stiftung, Cologne, Germany

References

Further reading

 David Ostrowski (2013). Auch die schönste Frau ist an den Füßen zu Ende = Even the most beautiful woman ends at her feet. Cologne: Meurer Verlag. .
 [s.n.] (2013). David Ostrowski: F Paintings. Berlin: Peres Projects. .
 [s.n.] (2014). David Ostrowski: How to do things left. Berlin: Peres Projects. .
 Christian Gether (2015). David Ostrowski: the F word.  Ishøj: Arken Museum of Modern Art. .
 Daniel Schreiber (2016). Nothing Happened / To Lose. Düren, Germany: Leopold-Hoesch-Museum & Papiermuseum.

1981 births
Living people
Artists from Cologne
German male painters
Kunstakademie Düsseldorf alumni
Casualist artists